Marshallena curtata is an extinct species of sea snail, a marine gastropod mollusk in the family Marshallenidae.

Description

Distribution
This extinct marine species  was found in the middle Tongaporutuan beds of Bell's Creek, New Zealand.

References

 Marwick, 1926, Trans. N.Z. Inst. 56 p. 325
 Maxwell, P.A. (2009). Cenozoic Mollusca. Pp 232–254 in Gordon, D.P. (ed.) New Zealand inventory of biodiversity. Volume one. Kingdom Animalia: Radiata, Lophotrochozoa, Deuterostomia. Canterbury University Press, Christchurch.

External links
 Vella, Paul. "Tertiary Mollusca from south-east Wairarapa." Transactions of the Royal Society of New Zealand. Vol. 81. No. 4. 1954

curtata
Gastropods described in 1926